Prior to the introduction of the Hot 100, The Billboard compiled multiple weekly record charts ranking the performance of singles in the United States. In 1945, the magazine published the following four all-genre national singles charts:

Best-Selling Popular Retail Records (named National Best Selling Retail Records until March 31) – ranked the most-sold singles in retail stores, as reported by merchants surveyed throughout the country. In the 21st century, Billboard designates Retail Records, in all its incarnations, as the magazine's canonical U.S. singles chart prior to August 1958.
Records Most-Played on the Air (introduced January 27 as Disks with Most Radio Plugs) – ranked the most-played songs on American radio stations, as reported by radio disc jockeys and radio stations.
Most-Played Juke Box Records – ranked the most-played songs in jukeboxes across the United States, as reported by machine operators.
Honor Roll of Hits (introduced March 24) – a composite ten-position song chart which combined data from the three charts above along with three other component charts. It served as The Billboards lead chart until the introduction of the Hot 100 in 1958 and would remain in print until 1963.

Note: In the issues dated February 10, April 14, May 5, June 9, and November 17, The Billboard reported a tie for the number-one single on one of its charts.

See also
1945 in music

References

1945
1945 record charts
1945 in American music